Peter W. Carruthers (born July 22, 1959) is a former American pair ice skater and a television skating analyst.

Carruthers and his adopted sister, Kitty, are the 1984 Olympic Silver medalists, the 1982 World Bronze medalists, and four-time United States National champions from 1981 to 1984.

Career 
The Carruthers team finished off the podium at the U.S. Championships in January 1979; however, their results improved during the following season. After winning the International St. Gervais in August 1979, they went on to win the Gold at the Nebelhorn Trophy and Silver at the 1979 Norton Skate (the inaugural Skate America). They placed 2nd at the 1980 U.S. Championships, and were assigned to their first Winter Olympics, where they finished in 5th place. They won their first U.S. National title in 1981, and stepped onto the World podium at the 1982 World Championships. In 1984, after winning their 4th National title, they were sent to their 2nd Winter Olympics and won the Silver medal.

Following the 1984 Winter Olympics, the Carruthers turned professional and starred with Ice Capades and Stars on Ice. For 12 years, they appeared throughout the world in many productions and made for television specials.

The Carruthers were inducted into the United States Figure Skating Hall of Fame in 1999.

The Carruthers siblings were coached by Ronald Ludington.

After retiring from professional skating, Carruthers worked as a skating analyst for the Fox, ABC, and ESPN television networks. In 2010, he worked as a daily NBC Olympics skating broadcast analyst on NBC's Universal Sports network.

Competitive highlights with Kitty Carruthers

References

External links
 Pairs on Ice profile

1959 births
American male pair skaters
American adoptees
Figure skating commentators
Figure skaters at the 1980 Winter Olympics
Figure skaters at the 1984 Winter Olympics
Living people
Olympic silver medalists for the United States in figure skating
Sportspeople from Middlesex County, Massachusetts
People from Burlington, Massachusetts
Olympic medalists in figure skating
World Figure Skating Championships medalists
Medalists at the 1984 Winter Olympics